Globe, a supermarket tabloid based in Boca Raton, Florida, covers politics, celebrity, human interest, and crime stories, largely sensationalist tabloid journalism.

History
Globe was first published in North America on November 10, 1954, in Montreal, Quebec, Canada, as Midnight, as a "bi-weekly ... devoted to Montreal night life", by Sunday Expresss Joe Azaria who later  hired John Vader, and Colin Gravenor.

During the 1960s, Midnight became the chief competitor to the National Enquirer.

In 1978, it changed its name to the Midnight Globe after its publisher, Globe Communications, and eventually to Globe. 

In 1999, American Media bought parent Globe Communications.

Circa 1991, Globe  caused controversy by publishing the name of the accuser in the William Kennedy Smith rape case.

Globe caused controversy by publishing the transcribed tapes of Frank Gifford's affair at a New York City hotel, cheating on his wife, Kathie Lee Gifford.
 
In mid-November 1995, Globe caused controversy by publishing Tejana singer Selena Quintanilla-Perez's autopsy photos, causing retailers in her home region of South Texas to pull and dispose of that edition of the tabloid. 

In 1997, Globe caused controversy by publishing autopsy photos of JonBenét Ramsey, causing retailers in her home region of Boulder, Colorado to pull that edition, though one local retailer retained stock of that edition.

In 2001, the offices of American Media in Boca Raton, Florida, were attacked with anthrax. A photo editor with The Sun, a sister publication to Globe, died from exposure to it, and the building was sealed for three years.

In 2003, Globe caused controversy by publishing the name of Kobe Bryant's accuser and putting her picture on its cover. Traditionally, media in the United States have refrained from revealing the names of alleged victims of sex crimes. Globe Editor-in-Chief Jeffrey Rodack defended the magazine's decision to publish her name in an article for the Poynter Journalism Institute.

On June 9, 2010, Globe caused controversy by publishing  deathbed photos of Gary Coleman claiming the former child actor was murdered.

In 2013, it led the fight to try to save TV's All My Children and One Life to Live.

In 2017,  Globe  was published out of American Media, Inc. headquarters in Boca Raton, Florida, and Dylan Howard, oversaw publication.

On April 18, 2019, it was announced that American Media Inc. had agreed to sell Globe to Hudson Group.
On April 18, 2019, AMI agreed to sell Globe and also the National Enquirer and National Examiner to Hudson Group.

Globe has a tendency to focus on more news and political-oriented content than its sister papers.

Further reading

References

External links
 

1954 establishments in Quebec
English-language magazines
Magazines published in Florida
Magazines published in Montreal
Magazines established in 1954
Supermarket tabloids
Weekly magazines published in the United States